Azel Backus (October 13, 1765 – December 28, 1816) was an American educator, born in New London County, Connecticut. After having a long preaching career, he was elected as the first President of Hamilton College in New York. He died on December 28, 1816, in Clinton, New York, at the age of 51 and is buried in Hamilton College Cemetery.

Early life 
Azel was born to Congregationalistic parents, Jabez Jr. and Deborah Backus on October 13, 1765 in New London County, Connecticut. He lost his father, Jabez, at the age of five which resulted in devolving of his education entirely on his mother, Deborah, for several years. He went to live with his uncle, Rev. Charles Backus at the age of seventeen. His uncle, Charles Backus, was a Congregational minister at Somers, Connecticut. Azel was fitted to attend College under his instruction. In 1783, he entered Yale College. While he was in the Yale, he grew deistic opinions and graduated in 1787 from there. He was perplexed after graduation to choose a profession, as his religious opinion preferenced him to the ministry, but he was favoring to join the army. When he decided to enter the army, his uncle, Charles Backus induced him to work in the ministry.  Later he studied theology with his uncle Charles, and was licensed to preach by the Association of Tolland County Ministers on June 1, 1790.

Career 
Soon after he left college, he joined as a teacher in a Grammar school at Wethersfield, Connecticut. After receiving his license to preach from Association of Tolland County, he preached at Ellington, Connecticut, to several Sabbaths and soon received multiple invitations to preach and become their pastor.

Backus, in 1798, was appointed by Oliver Wolcott, the first governor of Connecticut, to preach before the Legislature, The Annual Election Sermon, as well as Wolcott's funeral.

He was chosen General Association of Connecticut's Moderator in June 1808. Shortly after that, in 1810, the College of New Jersey honored him with Doctor of Divinity degree.

After moving to Bethlehem, Connecticut, he founded a select school for preparing students for College admission.

Backus was elected as the first president of Hamilton College in September 1812.

Personal life and death 
In February 1791, Backus married Melicent Demming of Wethersfield. Backus was survived by five of eight children, including F. F. Backus, a practicing physician at Rochester for many years after graduating from Yale College in 1813. F. F. Backus was a member of the New York Senate for four years, from 1844 to 1847.

Backus fell ill due to typhus fever in December 1816. Days after his illness, he died on December 28, 1816. His wife Melicent died at the age 88 in October 1853.

References 

People from New London County, Connecticut
1765 births
1816 deaths
Hamilton College (New York) people
Infectious disease deaths in New York (state)
American Congregationalist ministers
Yale College alumni
People from Bethlehem, Connecticut
People from Wethersfield, Connecticut
Deaths from typhus